Sharon Callus (born 28 April 1956) is a Maltese international lawn bowler.

She was born in Carlton, Victoria, Australia and was selected as part of the Maltese team for the 2018 Commonwealth Games on the Gold Coast in Queensland where she claimed a bronze medal in the Fours with Connie-Leigh Rixon, Rosemaree Rixon and Rebecca Rixon.

She is married to fellow Maltese international bowler Leonard Callus.

References

1956 births
Living people
Bowls players at the 2018 Commonwealth Games
Commonwealth Games bronze medallists for Malta
Commonwealth Games medallists in lawn bowls
Maltese bowls players
Sportspeople from Melbourne
People from Carlton, Victoria
Medallists at the 2018 Commonwealth Games